Karayusuf can refer to:

 3800 Karayusuf
 Karayusuf, Edirne